San Antonio de la Cal  is a town and municipality in Oaxaca in south-western Mexico. The municipality covers an area of 10.11 km². 
It is part of the Centro District in the Valles Centrales region.
As of 2005, the municipality had a total population of 15071.

References

Municipalities of Oaxaca